The princes of the Ming dynasty were titled and salaried members of the imperial bureaucracy with nominal lordship over various fiefs of Ming China. All were members of the imperial Zhu clan descended from the twenty-six sons of Zhu Yuanzhang (Hongwu Emperor). None of the princes controlled the administration of their nominal fief, unlike some tribal leaders or Confucius' descendants, the Dukes of Overflowing Sagacity, who continued to rule their territories outside of the normal provincial system.

Like all members of the imperial family, the princes were not bound by the standard imperial administration or courts. Instead, their status, promotions, and punishments were regulated by the Imperial Clan Court in the capital, which was staffed and directed by other members of the clan.

Generation names
The Hongwu Emperor considered that the names of descendants would be duplicated. Zhu Shouqian had given generation name poems to all of his sons and grandnephews. They each have poems with twenty characters for twenty generations of male-line descendants, starting from his great-grandnephew, Zhu Shouqian. The emperor decried that his descendant's given names must use characters with Wu Xing (Wood, Fire, Earth, Metal & Water). Only descendants of Zhu Shouqian's line do not need to follow this rule.

Title
The Chinese title of these lords was Wáng, which was held by the "emperors" of the Shang and Zhou dynasties and by the "kings" of the Warring States. The English translation of "prince" is generally preferred for these Ming rulers, however, owing to their extremely limited authority.

Royal and noble ranks of the Ming dynasty

Male members
Crown prince, Great Imperial Son (Huang Taizi), for eldest son and heir of an Emperor.
Crown prince, Great Imperial Grandson, for the eldest son of a crown prince.
First-rank Prince, for imperial son except the crown prince.
Hereditary Prince, Princely Son, for the eldest son and heir apparent of a 1st rank prince.
Hereditary Prince, Princely Grandson, for the eldest son of a hereditary prince.
Some princes had passed their principalities to their great-grandson too, their heir-apparent namely called "shizengsun" (Princely Great-Grandson). 
Second-rank commandery prince (or "Prince of XXX Commanders"), for all other sons of a crown prince and first-rank prince except their heir apparent.
Commandery chief son, for the eldest son and heir apparent of a commandery prince.
Commandery chief grandson, for the eldest son of a chief son.
Defender general, for all other sons of a second-rank commandery prince except his heir apparent. The privilege of this title was the same as first junior-rank officers.
Bulwark general, for the son of a defender general. The privilege was the same as second junior-rank officers.
Some younger sons of commandery princes were mothered by their concubinage, or if they have offended, they would be made the title bulwark general.
Supporter General, for the son of a bulwark general. The privilege was the same as third junior-rank officers.
Defender lieutenant, for the son of a supporter general. The privilege was the same as fourth junior-rank officers.
Defender lieutenant's primary consort would title reverent lady.
Bulwark lieutenant, for the son of a defender lieutenant. The privilege was the same as fifth junior-rank officers.
Bulwark lieutenant's primary consort would title proper lady.
Supporter lieutenant, for the son of a bulwark lieutenant. The privilege was the same as sixth junior-rank officers.
Supporter lieutenant's primary consort would title peace lady.
Son of a supporter lieutenant would be made the title of supporter lieutenant.

Female members
Princess, for daughters, sisters, and paternal aunts of emperors.
Prince Consort Commander, for the imperial son-in-law, and consorts to an emperor's sister or paternal aunt
Commandery princess, for the daughter of a crown prince or first-rank prince.
County princess, for the daughter of a commandery prince.
Commandery lady, for the daughter of a defender general.
County lady, for the daughter of a bulwark general.
Village lady, for the daughter of a supporter general.
Clanswoman, for the daughter of a lieutenant.
Except for imperial daughter and clanswoman, all of the consorts of these female members would be titled "yibin", their ranks apart were the same 1st, 2nd, 3rd, 4th, and 6th junior-rank officials

Offenders imperial member called as Commoner. If a 1st-rank prince was demoted, the imperial court would appoint one of their peerage members to presided the other members of the peerage, and namely called them as "clan councilor".

As the serious population growth of the imperial members during Wanli Emperor's reign, the emperor altered the salaries and restricted the succession orders for imperial members. The new succession order for a first-rank prince was: if a first-rank prince has no son to succeed his principality, a second-rank commandery prince (start from his brother and his brother's descendants, then paternal uncle, and his uncle's descendants, so on and so forth) still could succeed the principal. However, except for the successor's eldest son who would be the new heir for principality, all other younger sons of the successor could not promoted to the rank of second-rank princes even though they are sons of a first-rank prince. They could only held the title of defender general based on their father's original second-princely title designation.

History
During the Hongwu era at the founding of the dynasty, the emperor enfeoffed his many sons and gave them control over large garrisons of as many as 20,000 men. "The Weakening of the Marcher Lords") prompted the Jingnan Campaign of the Prince of Yan which ended with the apparent death of the young emperor in a palace fire and Yan's ascension as the Yongle Emperor. Despite justifying his campaign as an effort to uphold the traditions of the Hongwu Emperor and to free his nephew from the ill counsel of the court advisors, the Yongle Emperor completed the work of removing the imperial clan from the militarized borders with Mongolia, Manchuria, and Annam. For example, he granted the territory of the Prince of Ning  whose capture and support had been essential for Yan's victory and with whom he had promised to divide the empire  to allied Mongols and placed the prince himself in an ungarrisoned sinecure in Nanchang.

Over the course of the dynasty, some titles were absorbed by the crown, others abolished following unsuccessful revolution, and still others created for cadet branches of the dynasty.

Crown Prince

The crown prince of the empire was known as the Taizi (lit. "Supreme Son"). Under the terms of the Hongwu Emperor's dynastic instructions, he was to be selected in accordance with strict Confucian agnatic primogeniture: the eldest son of the primary consort succeeded, . Although legitimizing the ascension of the Yongle Emperor involved forged claims that he had been selected by the Hongwu Emperor over his brother Crown Prince Yiwen in direct violation of the emperor's own policy, the practice was subsequently observed except in the aftermath of the Tumu Incident. This repeatedly led to teenaged and even infant princes ascending to the throne and contributed to the domination of the government by powerful eunuch dictators.

Crown princes who failed to ascend to the imperial throne were given posthumous names including their title of taizi. They include:

 Crown Prince Yiwen, the Hongwu Emperor's eldest son Zhu Biao
 Crown Prince Hejian, the Jianwen Emperor's eldest son Zhu Wenkui
 Crown Prince Huaixian, the Jingtai Emperor's eldest son
 Crown Prince Daogong, the Chenghua Emperor's eldest son
 Crown Prince Aichong, the Jiajing Emperor's eldest son
 Crown Prince Zhuangjin, the Jiajing Emperor's 2nd son
 Crown Prince Huaichong, the Tianqi Emperor's eldest son
 Crown Prince Daohuai, the Tianqi Emperor's 2nd son
 Crown Prince Xianchong, the Tianqi Emperor's 3rd son
 Crown Prince Xianmin, the Chongzhen Emperor's eldest son

Lesser princes

Salaries for princes and other imperial family members
In 1370, the Hongwu Emperor created ten princely peerages: Qin, Jing, Yan, Zhou, Chu, Qi, Tan, Lu (鲁) and Jingjiang. Salaries for princes and princesses were set in 1376:
For a first-rank prince:
50 thousands koku of rice for a year
25 thousands of banknotes for a year
40 pairs of brocades for a year
300 pairs of reels for a year
each 100 pairs of "sha" and "luo" for a year
500 pairs of silk for a year
each 1000 of grass cloth and winter cloth for a year
2000 tael of cotton for a year
2000 "yin" of salt for a year
1000 catties of tea for a year
50 pairs of horses forage for a month
Satin for a year for self-made by own carpenters
For Prince of Jingjiang:
20 thousands koku of rice for a year
10 thousands of banknotes for a year
20 pairs of horses forage for a month
The other supplies for Prince of Jingjiang were half amount of a first-rank prince.
For unmarried imperial daughter and without title of a princess:
each 10 pairs of reels, "sha" and "luo" for a year
each 30 pairs silk, grass cloth and winter cloth
200 taels of cotton for a year
For married imperial daughter with the title of a princess:
granted a farmland
1500 koku of rice for a year
2000 of banknotes for a year
Supplies for son of a first-rank prince without any titles and peerages were same as non-title imperial daughter, while for non-title first-rank princely daughter were half amount of non-title 1st-rank princely son.

See also
 History of the Ming dynasty
 List of vassal prince peerages of the Ming dynasty
 Chinese nobility
 Kings of the Han dynasty

References

Ming dynasty princely peerages
Chinese royal titles